Limb region 1 protein homolog is a protein that in humans is encoded by the LMBR1 gene.

This gene encodes a member of the LMBR1-like membrane protein family. Another member of this protein family has been shown to be a lipocalin transmembrane receptor. A highly conserved, cis-acting regulatory module for the sonic hedgehog (protein) gene is located within an intron of this gene. Consequently, disruption of this genic region can alter sonic hedgehog expression and affect limb patterning, but if this gene functions directly in limb development is unknown. Mutations and chromosomal deletions and rearrangements in this genic region are associated with acheiropody and preaxial polydactyly, which likely result from altered sonic hedgehog expression.

References

Further reading